Vakha Abuevich Agaev (15 March 1953 – 23 September 2020) was a Russian politician, who, since 2011, had been a Member of the State Duma, representing the Krasnoyarsk region. He was a member of the Communist Party of the Russian Federation. He also served as Deputy Chairman of the State Duma committee on property. 

Agaev died from COVID-19 in 2020, during the COVID-19 pandemic in Russia.

References

1953 births
2020 deaths
Communist Party of the Russian Federation members
Deaths from the COVID-19 pandemic in Russia
Chechen people
Sixth convocation members of the State Duma (Russian Federation)
Seventh convocation members of the State Duma (Russian Federation)